Charles C. Cannon may refer to:

Charles Craig Cannon, aide to General Dwight D. Eisenhower 
Charles C. Cannon, alumni of Florida Institute of Technology